Cynthia Diane Kauffman (married name: Marshall; born August 23, 1948 in Seattle, Washington) is an American pair skater. With brother Ronald Kauffman, she is a four-time (1966–1969) U.S. national champion and a three-time (1966–1968) World bronze medalist. They represented the United States at the 1964 Winter Olympics and the 1968 Winter Olympics, placing 8th in 1964 and 6th in 1968.

They were inducted into the U.S. Figure Skating Hall of Fame in 1995.

Competitive highlights
(with Kauffman)

References

External links
 
 
  

American female pair skaters
Olympic figure skaters of the United States
Figure skaters at the 1964 Winter Olympics
Figure skaters at the 1968 Winter Olympics
Sportspeople from Seattle
1948 births
Living people
World Figure Skating Championships medalists
21st-century American women
20th-century American women